AP3 may refer to one of the following:

 The ABC Model of Flower Development
 Andrew Pendelton III, an American professional wrestler

AP-3 may refer to:

 USS Hancock (AP-3), a transport ship acquired by the United States Navy in 1902 which saw service during World War I
 AP-3C Orion, a variant of the P-3C Orion maritime patrol aircraft used by the Royal Australian Air Force